Jan Špan (born November 20, 1992) is a Slovenian professional basketball player who plays for Krka of the Slovenian League and the ABA League Second Division. He is a 1.89 m tall point guard.

Career
Špan averaged 8.8 points and 2.2 assists per game in 2017–18 for Petrol Olimpija. He re-signed with the team on July 1, 2018. On July 11, 2019, Špan signed with the Crailsheim Merlins of the Basketball Bundesliga. He averaged 9.4 points, 4.2 assists and 2.3 rebounds per game. On August 12, 2020, Špan signed with Delteco Gipuzkoa Basket of the Liga ACB. On September 1, 2021, Špan signed with Larisa of the Greek Basket League. On November 25 of the same year, however, he parted ways with the Greek club.

References

External links
Eurobasket.com profile
Realgm profile

1992 births
Living people
Basketball players from Ljubljana
ABA League players
BC Rakvere Tarvas players
Crailsheim Merlins players
Gipuzkoa Basket players
KK Krka players
KK Olimpija players
KK Zlatorog Laško players
Larisa B.C. players
Liga ACB players
Point guards
Slovenian expatriate basketball people in Estonia
Slovenian expatriate basketball people in Germany
Slovenian expatriate basketball people in Greece
Slovenian expatriate basketball people in Spain
Slovenian men's basketball players